The HESEG Foundation is a charitable foundation created by Canadians Gerry Schwartz and Heather Reisman in 2005 to provide scholarships to former lone soldiers (those without family in Israel) who serve in the Israel Defense Forces. HESEG provides money to cover tuition and living expenses for former "lone soldiers" who wish to remain in Israel to study after they've completed their military service.

Approximately 6,000 "lone soldiers" serve in the IDF in any one year. At a ceremony at Sde Dov Air Force Base in 2005 launching the foundation, Schwartz said "I hope that with the help of the Heseg Foundation, we will be able to grant lone soldiers, who have contributed and sacrificed so much for Israel, the chance to grow and enrich themselves academically, and, above all, that their future in Israel will be ensured."

In 2006, HESEG donated 100 mobile air conditioning units to provide relief for residents of northern Israel forced to live in bomb shelters during the Israel-Hezbollah War.

Schwartz and Reisman's role in the foundation has led to a boycott campaign by anti-Occupation activists of the Chapters and Indigo book chain (Chapters/Indigo) as Reisman owns the chains and Schwartz, her husband, serves on the company's board of directors.

Heseg is the Hebrew word for "achievement".

References

External links
HESEG Foundation website
Foundations based in Canada

Israel Defense Forces
Scholarships in Canada